The 2013 PTT Cup is a professional tennis tournament played on hard courts. It is the 1st edition of the tournament which is part of the 2013 ATP Challenger Tour. It took place in Istanbul, Turkey between 8 and 14 July 2013.

Singles main-draw entrants

Seeds

 1 Rankings are as of June 24, 2013.

Other entrants
The following players received wildcards into the singles main draw:
  Tuna Altuna
  Durukan Durmuş
  Barış Ergüden
  Anıl Yüksel

The following players received entry as alternates into the singles main draw:
  Edward Corrie
  Maximilian Neuchrist
  Mate Pavić

The following players received entry from the qualifying draw:
  Alexander Kudryavtsev 
  Mikhail Ledovskikh 
  David Rice
  Filip Veger

The following player received entry as a lucky loser:
  Mikhail Biryukov

Champions

Singles

 Benjamin Becker def.  Dudi Sela 6–1, 2–6, 3–2 ret.

Doubles

 James Cluskey /  Fabrice Martin def.  Brydan Klein /  Ruan Roelofse 3–6, 6–3, [10–5]

External links
Official Website

PTT Cup
PTT İstanbul Cup
2013 in Turkish tennis